La Paene Masara (born 1973-11-10) is a retired male boxer from Indonesia, who twice competed for his native Asian country at the Summer Olympics: 1996 and 2000. At his Olympic debut in Atlanta, Georgia he was defeated in the quarterfinals of the men's light flyweight division (– 48 kg) by Spain's eventual bronze medalist Rafael Lozano.

References
 sports-reference

1973 births
Indonesian Christians
Living people
Light-flyweight boxers
Boxers at the 1996 Summer Olympics
Boxers at the 2000 Summer Olympics
Olympic boxers of Indonesia
Indonesian male boxers
Sportspeople from Southeast Sulawesi